The Danish Girl is a novel by American writer David Ebershoff, published in 2000 by the Viking Press in the United States and Allen & Unwin in Australia.

Summary
The novel is a fictionalized account of the life of Lili Elbe, one of the first transgender women to undergo sex reassignment surgery.

The Danish Girl, as Ebershoff stated, does not try to tell a true story. He has not only imagined most of what he wrote about Elbe's inner life, but he has also fabricated all of the other characters in the book, most important among them Wegener's blue-blooded American-born wife, Gerda Wegener.

The story takes place in Copenhagen, Denmark. Lili (then going as Einar) is happily married to her wife, Gerda Wegener. Lili was raised as a boy with her best friend Hans. Gerda was raised in California with her twin brother Carlisle. She eventually moved to Denmark, and first met Lili at the Royal Academy. They were unfortunately separated due to events of World War I, but during their separation, Gerda marries another man named Teddy Cross and has a child, with the child unfortunately dying at birth and Teddy dying of tuberculosis. Gerda moves back to Denmark and marries Lili, the couple becoming painters with Lili painting mostly landscapes and Gerda painting portraits. 

One day, Anna Fonsmark, a friend of Gerda, cancels her scheduled painting session with Gerda. Gerda, needing to have the painting finished as soon as possible, requests Lili to model as Anna. The session is interrupted with Anna suddenly entering their home, and Anna, upon seeing Lili, gives her the name "Lili."

The couple are invited to the annual Artists' Ball. Gerda convinces Lili to wear a dress again. During the ball, Lili meets a man named Henrik Sandahl, and the two start a short-lived relationship, which Gerda discourages for she fears that Lili might be hurting Henrik by deceiving him.

Lili then starts having many nosebleeds and stomachaches, which leads to Gerda making Lili visit a doctor named Dr. Hexler. Gerda's true intentions however are actually to see if there is a tumor developing in her pelvis, for she believes that if a tumor were indeed there, it might be the cause of the nosebleeds, stomachaches, and psychological problems. Hexler performs an X-ray on Lili and sees that there is no tumor; however, he tells Gerda to discourage Lili from dressing up as Lili again.

Gerda starts to paint Lili more often, and these paintings spark popularity for Gerda. Lili feels that her gender dysphoria is only worsening. Gerda, meanwhile, meets Doctor Alfred Bolk. Bolk is interested in helping Einar become Lili completely. Lili eventually meets Doctor Bolk, Bolk who Einar of the surgeries he plans to do, to which Lili agrees. Bolk transfers to Dresden and Lili soon follows.

Hans eventually admits to Gerda that he also knows about Einar being Lili, which he is supportive of and tells Gerda to meet Lili in Dresden. The first operation removes Lili's testicles, but during the operation, Bolk reveals that Lili was supposed had undeveloped ovaries in her body the whole time, which he discloses to Gerda and restores in a succeeding operation.

Lili and Gerda then return to Denmark. Lili and Henrik fall in love, and Henrik then proposes to Lili and Hans asks Gerda to move with him to America. Bolk manages to contact Lili and tells her of a final operation; one that will give Lili a uterus to be able to become a mother. Lili tells Gerda of the operation, to which Gerda discourages as she finds it to be "too dangerous." Carlisle instead brings Lili to Dresden.

The surgery, however, was a failure as it has been found that an infection has grown inside Lili after the operation. Whether Lili lives or dies is unclear.

Awards
The Danish Girl  won the Rosenthal Foundation Award from the American Academy of Arts and Letters and the Lambda Literary Award. It was also a finalist for the Tiptree Award, the New York Public Library's Young Lions Award, and an American Library Association Award, and was a New York Times Notable Book.

Reception
In The New York Times Book Review, novelist and critic John Burnham Schwartz called the novel "arresting": "I hope people will read The Danish Girl. It is fascinating and humane." Critic Richard Bernstein wrote in The New York Times, "Mr. Ebershoff is telling us that love does involve a small dark space. The intelligence and tactfulness of his exploration of it make his novel a noteworthy event."

Translations
The novel has been translated into more than ten languages and is published in paperback by Penguin.

Film adaptation

The novel was adapted into a feature film directed by Tom Hooper, and starring Eddie Redmayne as Lili Elbe, Alicia Vikander as Gerda Wegener, Matthias Schoenaerts as Hans Axgil, Ben Whishaw as Henrik, Sebastian Koch as Dr. Kurt Warnekros and Amber Heard as Ulla Poulsen. The film received minor criticism for its illegitimate portrayal of historical events, but Redmayne and Vikander's performances received acclaim and nominations for all of the major acting awards. Vikander won the Academy Award for Best Supporting Actress and Redmayne was nominated for the Academy Award for Best Actor.

References

External links

 Rosenthal Family Foundation Awards from the American Academy of Arts and Letters
 Lambda Literary Award
 New York Times Notable Books
 Stonewall Book Awards
 New York Public Library Young Lions Award nomination
 Richard Bernstein in The New York Times on The Danish Girl
 Author's website

2000 American novels
American LGBT novels
Novels set in Copenhagen
Novels with transgender themes
Lambda Literary Award-winning works
Allen & Unwin books
American novels adapted into films
2000s LGBT novels
Cultural depictions of Lili Elbe
2000 LGBT-related literary works